Agathe Bonitzer (born 24 April 1989) is a French actress. She has appeared in more than twenty films since 1996.

Career
In August 2018, it was announced that Bonitzer would star in the Netflix science fiction series Osmosis. The series premiered on March 29, 2019.

In 2021, she was selected as jury member for Filmmakers of the present competition section of 74th Locarno Film Festival held from 4 to 14 August.

Personal life
She is the daughter of filmmakers Pascal Bonitzer and Sophie Fillières.

Filmography

References

External links 

 

1989 births
Actresses from Paris
Living people
French film actresses
21st-century French actresses